Alessandra Orselli (born 23 March 1950) is an Italian sprinter. She competed in the women's 4 × 100 metres relay at the 1972 Summer Olympics.

National titles
Orselli won three national titles at individual senior level.

Italian Athletics Indoor Championships
200 m: 1971
400 m: 1972, 1975

References

External links
 

1950 births
Living people
Athletes (track and field) at the 1972 Summer Olympics
Italian female sprinters
Olympic athletes of Italy
Place of birth missing (living people)
Olympic female sprinters
20th-century Italian women
21st-century Italian women